David Cliche (July 10, 1952 - July 19, 2020) was a Quebec politician. He represented Vimont in the National Assembly of Quebec from 1994 to 2002, as a member of the Parti Québécois.

He is the son of lawyer and former head of the New Democratic Party of Quebec, Robert Cliche and writer Madeleine Ferron. Cliche earned a bachelor's degree in Geology and a master's degree in Development from the University of Montreal (1977) and then began a career in environmental management.

Cliche ran for the Parti Québécois in the constituency of Vimont in 1989 but was defeated by Benoît Fradet of the Liberal Party, in 1994 he ran again and this time defeated Fradet and was part of the Parti Québécois government of Lucien Bouchard, he was re-elected in 1998.

Cliche held several ministerial positions in the governments of Lucien Bouchard and Bernard Landry: he was Minister of Environment and Wildlife (1996-1997), Minister for Tourism (1997-1998), Minister for the Information Highway and Government Services (1998-2001) and Minister for Research, Science and Technology (2001-2002).

Cliche resigned from his position as Minister and MNA for Vimont on January 30, 2002. Since leaving politics, he worked as an environmental consultant.

References 

1952 births
2020 deaths
Members of the Executive Council of Quebec
Parti Québécois MNAs
People from Beauce, Quebec
Université de Montréal alumni
20th-century Canadian legislators
21st-century Canadian legislators
French Quebecers